Germantown High School is a public high school in Germantown, Tennessee, and is part of the Shelby County Schools district. Three acres were purchased in 1910, and in 1911 students moved into the new building.

History

By 1910, the Shelby County Board of Education had purchased three acres for a new school building serving grades one through twelve, and also in 1911, students moved into the new building with five classrooms and a study hall. Wagonettes pulled by horses or mules were also the common mode transportation at the time, but by 1918, motorized wagonettes were used.

Additional rooms and buildings were added to both sides of a WPA facade in 1918, 1919, 1927, and 1935, for the Germantown Public School.

Athletics
Germantown High School offers a variety of sports: baseball, basketball, bowling, cross country, football, golf, cheerleading, soccer, softball, swimming, tennis, track and field, volleyball, wrestling, dance, and trap shooting.
 The football team won state championships in 1983 and 2003.
 The girls' soccer team won the state championship in 1999 and 2001.
 The boys' soccer team won state championships in 1983 and 1984.
 The Germantown boys' baseball team won the state championship in 1981, 1995, and 2001.
 The boys' golf team won the state championship in 1997
 The girls' volleyball team won the state championship in 1983, 1985, 1988, 1989, 1990, 2003 and 2005.
 The boys' tennis team won the state championship in 1980.

Notable alumni

 Mickey Callaway, professional baseball coach and former Major League Baseball player
 Ian Clark, international basketball player for the  Xinjiang Flying Tigers
 Debbie Elliott, National Public Radio broadcaster
Austin Hollins (born 1991), basketball player for Maccabi Tel Aviv of the Israeli Basketball Premier League 
 Ben Johnson, Major League Baseball player
 Paul Maholm, Major League Baseball pitcher
 Susan Marshall, vocalist, pianist, songwriter and recording artist
 Jeremy Padawer, kids toys and entertainment executive, creator of Monsuno television series on Nickelodeon
 Cindy Parlow, US women's national soccer team and U.S. Soccer executive
 Chris Parnell, Saturday Night Live actor
 Missi Pyle, actress in Galaxy Quest,  Dodgeball, and Broadway show Boeing Boeing Broadway 
 Eric Still, Houston Oilers offensive guard
 Tony Williams, Jacksonville Jaguars defensive tackle

References 

Germantown, Tennessee
Public high schools in Tennessee
International Baccalaureate schools in Tennessee
Schools in Shelby County, Tennessee
1910 establishments in Tennessee